is a former Japanese football player.

Playing career
Ota was born in Osaka Prefecture on March 14, 1981. He joined J2 League club Ventforet Kofu in 2001. He debuted as goalkeeper against Sagan Tosu on July 11. He played 6 matches in a row after the debut. However Ventforet could win no match and he could not play at all in the match after that. In 2002, he moved to Japan Football League club Ehime FC. He retired end of 2004 season.

Club statistics

References

External links

1981 births
Living people
Association football people from Osaka Prefecture
Japanese footballers
J2 League players
Japan Football League players
Ventforet Kofu players
Ehime FC players
Association football goalkeepers